The 1960 Maryland Terrapins football team represented the University of Maryland in the 1960 NCAA University Division football season. In their second season under head coach Tom Nugent, the Terrapins compiled a 6–4 record (5–2 in conference), finished in third place in the Atlantic Coast Conference, and outscored their opponents 171 to 164. The team's statistical leaders included Dale Betty with 796 passing yards, Pat Drass with 297 rushing yards, and Gary Collins with 404 receiving yards.

Schedule

References

Maryland
Maryland Terrapins football seasons
Maryland Terrapins football